Manok ni San Pedro is a 2013 Cebuano drama series aired by TV5 Channel 21 Cebu.

The drama was introduced during the network's mall show in Parkmall, Mandaue City on April 13, 2013, along with the network's other drama series such as Antigo and other network's programs.

Cast
 Wilson Navarro as Esteban "Teban" Escudero
 Shelie Cabante as Liza
 Marvin Sinamban as Arnold
 George Aznar as Don Miguel - Liza's father
 Vic Romarate as Don Alfonso - Arnold's father
 Cathleen Melgar as Rosie - Liza's sister
 Pedro Pongase as Rocky - Arnold's sidekick
 Geraldine Roldan as Geraldin - Don Alfonso's helper
 Nolito Morales Dayanan as Atty. Ismokoy Bira
 Isagani Nadela Sacol as Gani Boy
 Lani Durano Alerta as Mayang - Teban's cousin
 Miguelito Yburan as Ekong - Teban's father
 Mary Jane Lawas as Rustica - Teban's former love interest
 Lino Giolen as Atty. Bartolome "Tommy" Imbaw - Ogis' security guard
 Norman Bastid as Tarok Mongisi
 Gale Camus as Gale
 Ananias Barongo Waskin as Dondon
 Rey Salon as Sente - Don Miguel's errand boy
 Jasmine Dominguez as Rosa Mia
 Ricky Labang as Opong
 McArthur Flor Jr. as Glen
 Mariele Montellano as Inday

Production crew
 McArthur Flor Jr.
 Rey Salon
 Norman Bastida
 Jeffrey Salabande
 Nilo Camus

See also
 TV5 Cebu

References

TV5 (Philippine TV network) original programming
Television in Cebu City